Mazhom (also known as Mazhama) a village located in Budgam district of the union territory of Jammu and Kashmir. It has a railway station Mazhom railway station, which along with being in proximity (3 km) with Magam, the biggest financial hub of the district, has a crucial role in the economy communication in the area. Also there is railway flyover there on Gulmarag Road. 
The surrounding villages are Kawoosa Khalisa (east) and Kanihama (west). Mazhama is located on both sides of Gulmarg Highway. Schools in the Mazhama village are Hanfia English Medium School and Government High School. A well-facilitated dispensary is also present in this village, which is also home to two masjids. River Sukhnag, which is a tributary of the Jhelum, also flows along the boundary of the village.

References

Villages in Budgam district
Kashmir